Elizabeth Jean Peters (October 15, 1926 – October 13, 2000) was an American film actress. She is known as a star of 20th Century Fox in the late 1940s and early 1950s, and as the second wife of Howard Hughes. Although possibly best remembered for her siren role in Pickup on South Street (1953), Peters was known for her resistance to being turned into a sex symbol. She preferred to play unglamorous, down-to-earth women.

Late in her career, and after her retirement, Peters occasionally played roles in TV productions, appearing in four between 1973 and 1988.

Early life
Elizabeth Jean Peters was born on October 15, 1926, in East Canton, Ohio, the daughter of Elizabeth (née Diesel) and Gerald Peters, a laundry manager. Raised on a small farm in East Canton, Peters attended East Canton High School. She was raised as a Methodist. She went to college at the University of Michigan and later Ohio State University, where she studied to become a teacher and majored in literature.  

While studying for a teaching degree at Ohio State, she entered and won the Miss Ohio State Pageant in the fall of 1945, besting 11 other finalists. Sponsored by photographer Paul Robinson, she was awarded the grand prize of a screen test with 20th Century-Fox.

Career

20th Century Fox
As her agent, Robinson accompanied Peters to Hollywood, and helped her secure a seven-year contract with Fox. She dropped out of college to become an actress, a decision she later regretted. (In the late 1940s, Peters returned to college, in between filming, to complete her work and obtain a degree.)

Fox announced that in her first film I Wonder Who's Kissing Her Now (1947), she would play an "ugly duckling", supported by "artificial freckles and horn-rimmed glasses". She eventually withdrew from the film. Peters was tested in 1946 for a farm girl role in Scudda Hoo! Scudda Hay! (1948), but the producer and director decided she was not suitable.

Film debut
Peters was selected to replace Linda Darnell as the female lead in Captain from Castile (1947) opposite Tyrone Power, when Darnell was reassigned to save the production of Forever Amber.  Although she had not yet made her screen debut, Peters was highly publicized. She received star treatment during the filming. Captain from Castile was a hit. Leonard Maltin wrote that afterwards, Peters spent the new decade playing "sexy spitfires, often in period dramas and Westerns." 

She was offered a similar role in the Western Yellow Sky (1948), but she refused the part, explaining it was "too sexy". As a result, the studio, frustrated by her stubbornness, put her on her first suspension.

For her second film, Deep Waters (1948), which Peters filmed in late 1947, she was reunited with her director from Captain from Castile, Henry King. On this, she commented: "It's really a break for me, because he knows where he's going and what he wants, and I naturally have great confidence in him." The film was not nearly as successful as Captain from Castile, but Peters was again noticed.  She was named among the best five 'finds' of the year, among Barbara Bel Geddes, Valli, Richard Widmark and Wanda Hendrix. 

She was next assigned to co-star next to Clifton Webb in Mr. Belvedere Goes to College (1949), but Shirley Temple later replaced her.

In early 1949 Peters signed on to play Ray Milland's love interest in It Happens Every Spring (1949). For the role, she offered to bleach her hair, but the studio overruled this. Although the film became a success, most of the publicity was for Milland's performance.

Peters next starred alongside Paul Douglas in the period film Love That Brute (1950), for which she had to wear a dress so snug  she was unable to sit. The film was originally titled Turned Up Toes, and Peters was cast in the film in June 1949, shortly after the release of It Happens Every Spring. To prepare for a singing and dancing scene, Peters took a few lessons with Betty Grable's dance instructor.

By 1950, Peters was almost forgotten by the public, although she had been playing lead roles since 1947. In late 1950, she was cast in a secondary role as a college girl in Take Care of My Little Girl (1951), a Jeanne Crain vehicle. A Long Beach newspaper reported that Peters gained her role by impressing Jean Negulesco with her sewing. She once became famous for playing a simple country girl, but as she grew up, the studio did not find her any more suitable roles.

Stardom

At her insistence, Peters was given the title role in Anne of the Indies (1951), which the press declared was the film that finally brought her stardom.  Before its release, she was cast in Viva Zapata! (1952) opposite Marlon Brando. Julie Harris had been considered for this role. Also in 1951, Peters had her first collaboration with Marilyn Monroe, when they had secondary roles in As Young as You Feel.

Peters was set to play the title role in the drama film Wait Till the Sun Shines, Nellie (1952). It was the first time since the beginning of her career that Peters received this much publicity. While shooting the film in Hutchinson, Kansas, Peters was honored with the title 'Miss Wheatheart of America'. Peters was one of many names in the studios O. Henry's Full House (1952). She co starred with Jeffrey Hunter in Lure of the Wilderness (1952).

In 1953, director Samuel Fuller chose Peters over Marilyn Monroe for the part of Candy in Pickup on South Street. He said he thought Peters had the right blend of sex appeal and the tough-talking, streetwise quality he was seeking.  Monroe, he said, was too innocent-looking for the role.  Shelley Winters and Betty Grable had previously been considered, but both had turned it down. Because of the sexual attractiveness of her character, Peters was not thrilled with the role. She preferred playing more down-to-earth, unglamorous parts as she had done with Anne of the Indies (1951), Viva Zapata! (1952) and Lure of the Wilderness (1952).

For Pickup on South Street, Peters was advised to bleach her hair, but she refused to do so, wanting to avoid comparisons with Winters and Grable. She did agree to adopt a "sexy shuffle" for the role. She was helped by Marilyn Monroe to understand the role of a siren. Peters later said that she had enjoyed making the film, but announced in an interview that she was not willing to take on other siren roles. She said: "Pickup on South Street was fine for my career, but that doesn't mean I'm going to put on a tight sweater and skirt and slither around. I'm just not the type. On Marilyn Monroe it looks good. On me it would look silly." In another interview, Peters explained that playing down-to-earth and sometimes unwashed women have the most to offer in the way of drama.

She said:

 

Peters and Marilyn Monroe starred together in another 1953 film noir, Niagara, also starring Joseph Cotten. In Niagara, Peters replaced Anne Baxter, with whom she co-starred in the anthology film O. Henry's Full House (1952). Shooting of Niagara took place in the summer of 1952. Peters's character was initially the leading role, but the film eventually became a vehicle for Monroe, who was by that time more successful.

Peters's third film in 1953, A Blueprint for Murder, reunited her with Joseph Cotten. She was assigned to the film in December 1952 and told the press she liked playing in the film because it allowed her to sing, but no song by her is used in the picture, only the playing of a piano. Shortly after the film's  premiere in July 1953, the studio renewed Peters' contract for another two years.

In 1953, she also starred in the film noir Vicki. Writer Leo Townsend bought the story of the film, a remake of I Wake Up Screaming, as a vehicle for Peters. Townsend said that he gave the role to Peters in December 1952, because she was "one of the greatest sirens he's ever seen."

Next, Peters was assigned to replace Crain in the film Three Coins in the Fountain (1954), which was shot on location in late 1953 in Italy. Peters was unsatisfied with her role and said in a September 1953 interview: "When I heard Dorothy McGuire, Clifton Webb, and Maggie McNamara were going to be in the picture, I thought I would finally have the kind of role that suited me. They sounded like smart, sophisticated company. But when I got to Italy and read the script, I discovered I was going to be an earthy kind of girl again. The script had me nearly being killed in a runaway truck." However, the film became a great success and brought Peters again into the limelight.

Final films

Other 1954 films co-starring Peters were the Westerns Apache (borrowed by Warner Bros.) and Broken Lance. Although Broken Lance did not attract much attention, she was critically acclaimed for her performance in Apache. One critic praised her for "giving an excellent account for herself", declaring she was "on her way to becoming one of the finest young actresses around Hollywood today."

Peters's next (and ultimately final) film was A Man Called Peter (1955), in which she played Catherine Marshall, the wife of Peter Marshall, a Presbyterian minister and chaplain of the United States Senate. After the release of A Man Called Peter, Peters refused several roles, for which she was placed on suspension by the studio.

Retirement
Deciding she had had enough, Peters left Fox to focus on her private life. Following her marriage to Howard Hughes, she retired from acting. In 1957, the producer Jerry Wald tried to persuade her not to leave Hollywood but had no luck. She was supposedly discouraged from continuing as an actress by Hughes, and reported in late 1957 that she was planning on becoming a producer.

In March 1959, it was announced that Peters was to return to the screen for a supporting role in The Best of Everything. But, she did not appear in that film; and, despite her earlier announcement, never produced a film.

Return to acting
In 1970, rumors arose of Peters making a comeback to acting when the press reported that she was considering three film offers and a weekly TV series for the 1970–1971 season. She chose the television movie Winesburg, Ohio (1973). Afterwards, she said, "I am not pleased with the show or my performance in it. I found it rather dull." At the beginning, she had expressed enthusiasm for the project, saying: "I'm very fond of this script. It's the right age for me. I won't have to pretend I'm a glamour girl." Her co-star William Windom praised her, saying she was "warm, friendly, and charming on the set."

In 1976, Peters had a supporting role in the TV miniseries The Moneychangers. When asked why she took the role, she said: "I'll be darned if I know. A moment of madness, I think. I ran into my old friend Ross Hunter, who was producing The Moneychangers for NBC-TV, and he asked me if I wanted to be in it. It seemed like fun. It's a nice part – not too big – and I greatly admire Christopher Plummer, whom I play opposite."

Peters appeared in the 1981 television film Peter and Paul, produced by her then-husband, Stan Hough. She guest-starred in Murder, She Wrote in 1988, which was her final acting performance.

Personal life
After landing a contract in Hollywood, Peters moved there, where she initially lived with her aunt, Melba Diesel. From the beginning of her career, Peters openly admitted she did not like fame due to the crowds. Co-actors at Fox recalled that she was very serious about her career. Jeanne Crain said Peters was "anything but a party girl". Despite her clashes with the studio, Peters was well-liked by other contract players.

One biographer recalled: "In all the research and planning that went into this book, no one ever had an unkind word to say of Miss Peters, and that is unusual." Peters was close friends with Marilyn Monroe, who also worked for Fox. Other actors she befriended during her career were Joseph Cotten, David Niven, Ray Milland, Marie McDonald, and especially Jeanne Crain.

In 1954, Peters married Texas oilman Stuart Cramer (grandson of Stuart W. Cramer). At the time they married, they had known each other for only a few weeks, and they separated a few months later. There was much talk of Peters possibly retiring from the screen, but the actress insisted that after her eight-week leave from Fox, she was to return to Hollywood.

The decorated soldier and actor, Audie Murphy, met Peters when both were students at the Actors Lab. They had a very warm affair in 1946; during this time she met Howard Hughes.

In 1957, after her divorce from Cramer, Peters married Howard Hughes.  Soon after that, he retreated from public view and, reportedly, started becoming an eccentric recluse. The couple had met in the 1940s, before Peters became a film actress. During their highly publicized romance in 1947 there was talk of marriage, but Peters said that she could not combine it with her career. The columnist Jack Anderson claimed that Peters was "the only woman [Hughes] ever loved." He reportedly had his security officers follow her everywhere even when they were not in a relationship. The actor Max Showalter confirmed this, after becoming a close friend of Peters during shooting of Niagara (1953).

During her marriage, which lasted from 1957 to 1971, Peters retired from acting and social events in Hollywood. According to a 1969 article, she went through life unrecognized, despite being protected by Hughes's security officers all day. Living in anonymity was easy, according to Peters, because she "didn't act like an actress." It was later reported that during the marriage, Peters was frequently involved in activities such as charitable work, arts and crafts, and university studies including psychology and anthropology at UCLA.

In 1971, Peters and Hughes divorced. She agreed to a lifetime alimony payment of $70,000 ($ today) annually, adjusted for inflation, and she waived all claims to Hughes's estate, then worth several billion dollars. In the media, she refused to speak about the marriage, claiming she preferred to focus on the present and future. She said that she hoped to avoid being known as 'Mrs. Howard Hughes' for the rest of her life, although that would be difficult. "I'm a realist. I know what the score is, and I know who the superstar is."

Later in 1971, Peters married Stan Hough, an executive with 20th Century Fox. They were married until Hough's death in 1990. 

Peters died of leukemia on October 13, 2000, in Carlsbad, California, two days before her 74th birthday. She was buried at the Holy Cross Cemetery in Culver City, California.

Filmography

Radio appearances

CBS Radio Network LUX RADIO THEATER "The Day the Earth Stood Still" Monday 4 January 1954

References

External links

 
 Jean Peters: Biography of a forgotten leading lady, Jackal's film corner, October 16, 2007
 "Jean Peters biography", Guardian Unlimited Film
 Reviews of Jean Peters movies, Channel 4 Film
 Jean Peters, Allmovie

Actresses from Ohio
American film actresses
American television actresses
Deaths from cancer in California
Deaths from leukemia
Ohio University alumni
Actors from Canton, Ohio
1926 births
2000 deaths
Burials at Holy Cross Cemetery, Culver City
20th Century Studios contract players
20th-century American actresses
University of Michigan alumni
Methodists from Ohio
People from East Canton, Ohio